Last of the Summer Wine's twenty-eighth series aired on BBC One. All of the episodes were written by Roy Clarke and produced and directed by Alan J. W. Bell.

Outline
The trio in this series consisted of:

Last appearances

Smiler Hemingway (1988, 1990–2007)

List of Episodes

DVD release
The box set for series 28 was released by Universal Playback in May 2016, mislabelled as a box set for series 29 & 30.

References

Last of the Summer Wine series
2007 British television seasons